Henry Jeremy Hugh Wheare (born 1952) is a retired coxswain who competed for Great Britain and practices intellectual property law in Hong Kong.

Rowing career 
Wheare was the cox of the losing Cambridge boat in the 1974 Boat Race (won by Oxford in record time), and cox of the 1972 Head of the River crews of Jesus College Boat Club (Cambridge).

He was selected by Great Britain as cox of the lightweight eight that secured a silver medal at the 1976 World Rowing Championships in Villach, Austria.

Legal Career 
After a degree in law at Cambridge, Wheare practiced intellectual property law as a solicitor and UK patent attorney in London.  He moved to Hong Kong in 1985 where he was from 1991-97 President of the Hong Kong Group of the Asian Patent Attorneys Association (APAA) and is currently (2022) a Vice-President of the Association at large, representing Hong Kong.

Personal life 
He is the youngest son of the distinguished academic Sir Kenneth Wheare, former Vice-Chancellor of the University of Oxford, and brother of Tom Wheare former headmaster of Bryanston School.

References

1952 births
British male rowers
World Rowing Championships medalists for Great Britain
Living people

Patent attorneys